Trident is a civil parish in the metropolitan borough of the City of Bradford, West Yorkshire, England.  It contains 83 listed buildings that are recorded in the National Heritage List for England.  Of these, three are listed at Grade II*, the middle of the three grades, and the others are at Grade II, the lowest grade.  The parish is to the south of the city of Bradford, and includes the areas of Little Horton and West Bowling.  The parish is mainly residential, and includes some remnants of the textile industry.  Most of the listed buildings are houses, cottages and associated structures, and the other listed buildings include churches and chapels, almshouses, a workhouse later converted into a hospital, and former textile mill buildings.


Key

Buildings

References

Citations

Sources

 

Lists of listed buildings in West Yorkshire
Listed